Miyabi (written: 雅 or 雅日) is a feminine Japanese given name. Notable people with the name include:

, Japanese tennis player
, Japanese footballer
, Japanese singer and member of Berryz Kobo
, Japanese figure skater
, Japanese snowboarder
Maria Ozawa, Japanese AV actress formerly known as Miyabi
, Japanese hurdler

Fictional characters
, a character in the video game series Senran Kagura
Miyabi, a character in Xenoblade Chronicles 3
, a character in the manga series Great Teacher Onizuka
, a character in the anime series Aikatsu!
, a character in the manga series Ai Yori Aoshi
, a character in the light novel series Kono Naka ni Hitori, Imouto ga Iru!
, a character in the light novel series Absolute Duo
, a character in the manga series GA Geijutsuka Art Design Class

See also
Miyavi, a Japanese rock musician formerly known as Miyabi while in the band Dué le Quartz

Japanese feminine given names